Harold Wright (born November 12, 1947) is an American politician who served in the Oklahoma House of Representatives from the 57th district from 2008 to 2020.

References

1947 births
21st-century American politicians
Living people
Republican Party members of the Oklahoma House of Representatives
People from Weatherford, Oklahoma